St. Peter's Episcopal Church and Rectory is a historic Episcopal church and rectory in Blairsville, Indiana County, Pennsylvania.  The church was built in 1830, and is a small, rectangular brick building on a stone foundation in an Early Gothic Revival style.  It features a belfry atop the front entrance gable roof.  The rectory was built in 1889, and is a -story, wood-frame building with Eastlake movement elements.

It was added to National Register of Historic Places in 1988.

References

Episcopal churches in Pennsylvania
Churches on the National Register of Historic Places in Pennsylvania
Queen Anne architecture in Pennsylvania
Gothic Revival church buildings in Pennsylvania
Churches completed in 1830
19th-century Episcopal church buildings
Churches in Indiana County, Pennsylvania
1830 establishments in Pennsylvania
National Register of Historic Places in Indiana County, Pennsylvania